The IZA Journal of Development and Migration is a peer-reviewed open access academic journal covering all aspects of human migration, especially from an economical point of view. It is published by Sciendo on behalf of the IZA Institute of Labor Economics. The editors-in-chief are Amelie F. Constant (George Washington University) and Denis Fougère (CNRS, Paris)].

The journal was established in 2012 and is abstracted and indexed in EconLit and RePEc.

References

External links 
 

Springer Science+Business Media academic journals
Publications established in 2012
Creative Commons Attribution-licensed journals
English-language journals
Anthropology journals
Economics journals
Migration studies